The 1949 All-Pacific Coast football team consists of American football players chosen by various organizations for All-Pacific Coast teams for the 1949 college football season.

Selections

Backs
 Ken Carpenter, Oregon State (AP-1; Coaches-1 [halfback]; INS-1 [halfback])
 Eddie LeBaron, College of the Pacific (AP-1; INS-1 [quarterback])
 Bob Celeri, California (AP-1; Coaches-1 [quarterback])
 Bill Martin, USC (AP-1; Coaches-1 [fullback])
 Don Paul, Washington State (Coaches-1)
 Ernie Johnson, UCLA (INS-1 [halfback])
 Ollie Matson, San Francisco (INS-1 [fullback])

Ends
 Bob Wilkinson, UCLA (AP-1; Coaches-1; INS-1)
 Ray Bauer, Montana (Coaches-1)
 Darrell Robinson, Oregon (AP-1)
 Bill McColl, Stanford (INS-1)

Tackles
 Jim Turner, California (AP-1; Coaches-1; INS-1)
 Jim Cullom, California (Coaches-1; INS-1)
 Carl Kiilsgaard, Idaho (AP-1)

Guards
 Rod Franz, California (AP-1; Coaches-1; INS-1) (College Football Hall of Fame)
 Vern Sterling, Santa Clara (AP-1; INS-1)
 Ray Colquitt, Idaho (Coaches-1)

Centers
 Jim Castagnoli, Stanford (AP-1; Coaches-1; INS-1)

Key

AP = Associated Press

Coaches = selected by the conference coaches

INS = International News Service

Bold = Consensus first-team selection of at least two selectors from the AP, Coaches and INS

See also
1949 College Football All-America Team

References

All-Pacific Coast Football Team
All-Pacific Coast football teams
All-Pac-12 Conference football teams